Filip Adamović (born December 15, 1988) is a Bosnian professional basketball player for Belfius Mons-Hainaut of the Pro Basketball League. He also represents the Bosnia and Herzegovina national team.

References

External links
 Eurobasket.com Profile
 Eurocupbasketball.com Profile

1988 births
Living people
BC Tsmoki-Minsk players
Belfius Mons-Hainaut players
Bosnia and Herzegovina men's basketball players
CS Universitatea Cluj-Napoca (men's basketball) players
CSU Asesoft Ploiești players
KK Igokea players
KK Sloboda Tuzla players
OKK Borac players
Point guards
Serbian expatriate basketball people in Belarus
Serbian expatriate basketball people in Bosnia and Herzegovina
Serbian expatriate basketball people in Romania
Serbian people of Bosnia and Herzegovina descent
Serbs of Bosnia and Herzegovina
Basketball players from Belgrade